Stan Smith was the defending champion but lost in the second round to Raymond Moore.

Brian Gottfried won in the final 6–2, 6–4, 6–3 against Trey Waltke.

Seeds
The draw allocated unseeded players at random; as a result three seeds and one lucky loser received a bye into the second round.

  Brian Gottfried (champion)
  Yannick Noah (semifinals)
  Balázs Taróczy (semifinals)
  Corrado Barazzutti (second round)
  Stan Smith (second round)
  Heinz Günthardt (third round)
  Bob Lutz (third round)
  Tomáš Šmíd (quarterfinals)
  Raúl Ramírez (first round)
 n/a
  Rolf Gehring (quarterfinals)
  Bernard Mitton (second round)
  Gianni Ocleppo (first round)
  Chris Lewis (second round)
  Pascal Portes (third round)
  Colin Dibley (second round)

Draw

Finals

Top half

Section 1

Section 2

Bottom half

Section 3

Section 4

References
 1980 Fischer-Grand Prix Draw

1980 Fischer-Grand Prix